The strong dollar policy is the United States economic policy based on the assumption that a strong exchange rate of the United States dollar (where a smaller dollar amount is needed to buy the same amount of other currency than would otherwise be the case) is in the interests of the United States and the whole world. It is said to be also driven by a desire to encourage foreign bondholders to buy more Treasury securities. The United States Secretary of the Treasury occasionally states that the U.S. supports a strong dollar. The policy keeps inflation low, encourages foreign investment, and maintains the currency's role in the global financial system.

Background

Exchange rate weapon 
The term "exchange rate weapon" was introduced by Professor of International Economic Relations at the School of International Service at American University Randall Henning to describe the threat of manipulating the exchange rate of a strong country's currency with that of a weak country's currency, in order to extract policy adjustments from their governments and central banks. The strong dollar policy arose in response to the use of the exchange rate weapon.

Strong vs. weak dollar 
A strong currency helps domestic importers as their currency buys more, benefits foreign exporters as their exports garner more, hurts domestic exporters as there are not as many foreign buyers, and harms foreign importers as they cannot buy as much. A weak currency does the opposite of the above. They are summed up in the tables below.

History

1971–1973 
In spite of the Bretton Woods agreement, United States (U.S.) officials suspended gold convertibility and imposed a ten percent surcharge on imports in August 1971. This prompted the G-10 Smithsonian Agreement, a temporary agreement negotiated in 1971 among the ten leading developed nations in the world. The agreement pegged the Japanese yen, the Deutsche Mark, and the British pound sterling and French franc at seventeen percent, fourteen percent, and nine percent, respectively, below the Bretton Woods parity. These proved unsustainable. Later in 1971, U.S. officials permanently floated the dollar; a second devaluation of the dollar against major currencies and a permanent “float” of major European currencies against the dollar followed in February 1973. When the dollar fell in value, the U.S. did little to slow or reverse the fall; this dollar slump incentivized European and Japanese officials to deliver expansionary policies.

1977–1978 
In 1977 the Carter administration advocated and initiated the “locomotive theory”, which posits that big economies pull along their smaller brethren. Carter’s theory asked for concessions from the smaller countries to benefit the U.S. for the high price the U.S. has incurred for their benevolence after the 1973-75 recession. The American initiative met with staunch German and Japanese resistance at first. In response, U.S. authorities let it be known that they would allow the dollar to depreciate against the dissenting countries' currencies in the absence of macroeconomic stimuli. Eventually, Japanese prime minister Takeo Fukuda agreed to the U.S. stimulus request in late 1977. A year later at the Bonn Economic Summit in July 1978, German Chancellor Helmut Schmidt acceded to expansionary fiscal policy as a part of a package of mutual concessions.

1980–1985 
There was a twenty-six percent appreciation of the dollar between 1980 and 1984 as the result of a combination of tight monetary policy during the 1980-82 period under Federal Reserve Chairman Paul Volcker and expansionary fiscal policy associated with Ronald Reagan's administration during the 1982-84 period. The combination of these events pushed up Long-term interest rates, which in turn attracted a capital inflow and appreciated the U.S. dollar. The 1981-84 Reagan administration had an explicit policy of "benign neglect" toward the foreign exchange market. Some U.S. trade partners expressed concerns over the magnitude of the dollar's appreciation, advocating for intervention in the foreign exchange market in order to dampen such moves. However, Secretary of the Treasury Donald Regan and other administration officials rejected these notions, arguing that a strong dollar was a vote of confidence in the U.S. economy. At the Versailles Summit of G-7 leaders in 1982, the U.S. agreed to the requests of other member nations to allow an expert study of the effectiveness of foreign exchange interventions. The eponymous "Jurgenson Report", named after its lead researcher Phillipe Jurgenson, was submitted to the 1983 Williamsburg Summit where the requesting nations were disappointed that the findings did not support their advice. Only slightly deterred, the Plaza Accords in 1985 occurred. (The Plaza Accords were an impetus for the G-7 Finance Ministers as the group of officials that had met in New York were the first officials for it.) However, the U.S. began “talking down” the dollar further in order to encourage stimuli to domestic demand in Japan and Germany.

1990s 
In 1992, following a recession with a slow recovery and a delayed response in the labor markets, Bill Clinton's administration signaled the desirability of yen appreciation against the dollar: "I would like to see a stronger yen.” Also, in February 1993, then-Treasury Secretary Lloyd Bentsen reiterated the position when he was asked if he'd like to see a weaker dollar. These comments were to influence the USDJPY so as to protect against Japanese export-growth at the expense of the U.S. current account position. Afterwards, the dollar slumped against the yen, moving the yen to the 100 level against the dollar in the 1993 summer.

Inception 
In response to the ailing dollar, on 25 April the G-7 Finance Ministers and Central Bank Governors released a statement from their meeting in Washington, D.C. calling for the orderly appreciation of the dollar:“The ministers and governors expressed concerns about recent developments in exchange markets. They agreed that recent movements have gone beyond the levels justified by underlying economic conditions in the major countries. They also agreed that orderly reversal of those movements is desirable, would provide a better basis for the continued expansion of international trade and investment, and would contribute to our common objectives of sustained non-inflationary growth. They further agreed to strengthen their efforts in reducing internal and external imbalances and to continue to cooperate closely in exchange markets.”Replacing Treasury Secretary Lloyd Bentsen early in December 1994, Robert E. Rubin responded to the dollar’s depreciation with: “A strong dollar is in our national interest.” Thus, in 1995, Rubin re-set U.S. dollar policy, stating, in paraphrase: The strong-dollar policy is a U.S. government policy based on the assumption that a strong exchange rate of the dollar is both in the U.S. national interest and in the interest of the rest of the world. Rubin further emphasized that it “wouldn’t be used as a tool for trade." In essence, the strong dollar policy was seen as a way to assure investors that Washington would not intervene in exchange markets to debase the currency, a de-weaponization of the foreign exchange market, as Marc Chandler says. Robert Rubin’s motivation for introducing the strong dollar policy revolved around his desire to keep U.S. bond yields low, and to avoid criticism from trade partners that America was deliberately devaluing its currency to boost exports. Initially, the rhetoric helped the dollar rise by thirty percent between 1995 and 2002, but some assert that this had more to do with U.S. monetary tightening and the Dot-com bubble than any deliberate policy initiatives. Nevertheless, the dollar underwent an extraordinary revival since hitting lows in April 1995, rising more than 50 percent against the yen and nearly 20 percent against the mark by 1997 — with an appreciation of 7.5 percent against the yen and 8.7 percent against the mark from 1 January 1997 to 7 February 1997.

21st century 
Since inception, the strong dollar policy has usually consisted as periodic statements by government officials insisting that the U.S. continues to pursue a strong dollar. However, the status quo is not always adhered to. For example, during the World Economic Forum in Davos, Switzerland, Secretary of the Treasury Steven Mnuchin was quoted saying "a weak dollar is good for U.S. trade", which was an impetus for a one percent drop in the U.S. Dollar Index by six days later.

See also
Hard currency
International use of the U.S. dollar
Superdollar (economics)

References

Foreign exchange market
Commercial policy
United States economic policy